Shivaji Surathkal also known as Shivaji Surathkal: The Case of Ranagiri Rahasya is a 2020 mystery thriller Kannada language film written and directed by Akash Srivatsa, produced by Anup Gowda, Reka KN, starring Ramesh Aravind and Radhika Narayan in lead roles. The film is Ramesh's 101st movie. The plot revolves around a murder mystery beginning in Ranagiri. After the success of the film, makers have decided to create a franchise and have planned to produce a sequel of the film.

Plot 
The movie revolves around the murder of Roshan, son of State Home minister, in a resort in Ranagiri. Shivaji Surathkal (Ramesh Aravind), a police officer is assigned to investigate the murder mystery. Accompanied by Govind, a police constable, he uncovers the mysteries surrounding the murder and the area around. Parallelly, his past and his wife Janani's (Radhika Narayan) disappearance is revealed, which haunts him during this investigation. The plot further dwells into Shivaji's inner struggle to deal with the past and the present and solve the case.And a twist waits for the viewer in the end. The story is heavily inspired by Agatha Christie's Murder on the Orient Express.

Cast
 Ramesh Aravind as Shivaji Surathkal
 Radhika Narayan as Janani
 Aarohi Narayan as Dr.Anjali
 Avinash as Rajiv Ravi, home minister 
 Raaghu Raamanakoppa as Govindu
 Ramesh Pandit as S P Raheem
 Vinay Gowda as Roshan Ravi
 Rohith Bhanuprakash as Preetam Shetty 
 Amita Ranganath as Soukya Ajjampura 
 Namratha Surendranath as Smitha Shetty
 PD Sathish Chandra as Vidhyasagar
 Lakshmi Anand as Eureka Lobo
 K Pradeep as Valerian Lobo aka Bhata
 Kiran Kotta as Driver Anwar 
 Nishant Gudihalli as SI Rudresh
 Dhanush Raj as Bro 
 Surya Vasishta as Somjith Gupta
 Mana Adhvik as SI Rakesh 
 Sukanya Girish as Jessica Lobo
 Ram Manjjonaath as Ram a Rajeev Ravi PA
 Vidhya Murthy as Janani's Mother

Soundtrack

Reception

Critical Reception
The New Indian Express gave the film a rating of 3.5 out of 5, saying "Ramesh Aravind sheds his regular image, and this transformation was possible only because of the director and writer’s imagination, and the actor’s versatility."
Baradwaj Rangan of Film Companion South titled his review as despite an interesting premise, [the film is] an underwhelming murder mystery.

Box Office
The movie was reported to have collected ₹2 crores in the first week of its run.

Awards and nominations

Sequel
On September 10 2021, on the occasion of Ramesh Aravind's birthday director Akash Srivatsa announce movie sequel titled as Shivaji Surathkal 2: The Mysterious Case of Mayavi. director revealed that titular character seen in three different shades.

References

External links
 

2020s Kannada-language films
2020 films
Films shot in Karnataka
Indian nonlinear narrative films
Indian mystery thriller films
2020s mystery thriller films
Films about murder
Indian detective films
2020 thriller films
Films directed by Akash Srivatsa